Austin Jones may refer to:

 Austin Jones (coach), American football coach
 Austin Jones (musician) (born 1992), American convicted sex offender, musician and former YouTuber

See also
 Austinn Jones (born 1976), former Australian rules footballer